The 2006 Singer Sri Lankan Airlines Rugby 7s was the eighth year that the Singer Sri Lankan Airlines Rugby 7s tournament had been held. South Korea defeated China 24 - 19 in the final of the Cup.

Pool Stage

Pool A

{| class="wikitable" style="text-align: center;"
|-
!width="200"|Teams
!width="40"|Pld
!width="40"|W
!width="40"|D
!width="40"|L
!width="40"|PF
!width="40"|PA
!width="40"|+/−
!width="40"|Pts
|-style="background:#ccffcc"
|align=left| 
|2||2||0||0||98||7||+91||6
|-style="background:#ccffcc"
|align=left| 
|2||1||0||1||33||42||-9||4
|-
|align=left| 
|2||0||0||2||7||89||-82||2
|}

Pool B
{| class="wikitable" style="text-align: center;"
|-
!width="200"|Teams
!width="40"|Pld
!width="40"|W
!width="40"|D
!width="40"|L
!width="40"|PF
!width="40"|PA
!width="40"|+/−
!width="40"|Pts
|-style="background:#ccffcc"
|align=left|  
|2||2||0||0||80||5||+75||6
|-style="background:#ccffcc"
|align=left| 
|2||1||0||1||46||31||+15||4
|-
|align=left| 
|2||0||0||2||5||95||−90||2
|}

Pool C
{| class="wikitable" style="text-align: center;"
|-
!width="200"|Teams
!width="40"|Pld
!width="40"|W
!width="40"|D
!width="40"|L
!width="40"|PF
!width="40"|PA
!width="40"|+/−
!width="40"|Pts
|-style="background:#ccffcc"
|align=left| 
|2||2||0||0||79||7||+72||6
|-style="background:#ccffcc"
|align=left|  Arabian Gulf
|2||1||0||1||37||40||-3||4
|-
|align=left| 
|2||0||0||2||0||69||−69||3
|}

 40 - 07  Arabian Gulf
 Arabian Gulf 30 - 00 
 39 - 00

Pool D
{| class="wikitable" style="text-align: center;"
|-
!width="200"|Teams
!width="40"|Pld
!width="40"|W
!width="40"|D
!width="40"|L
!width="40"|PF
!width="40"|PA
!width="40"|+/−
!width="40"|Pts
|-style="background:#ccffcc"
|align=left| 
|2||2||0||0||86||7||+79||6
|-style="background:#ccffcc"
|align=left| 
|2||1||0||1||47||45||+2||4
|-
|align=left| 
|2||0||0||2||7||88||+81||2
|}

 38 - 07 
 48 - 00 
 40 - 07

Knockout stage

Bowl

Plate

Cup

References

2006
2006 rugby sevens competitions
2006 in Asian rugby union
rugby sevens